Drummore was a merchant ship built at Leith, Scotland in 1830. She transported a military convict to New South Wales.

Career
Under the command of Peter Petrie from Mauritius, she arrived at Sydney on 12 September 1831, with a military convict Michael Costello.

Citations
Citations

1830 ships
Ships built in Scotland
Convict ships to New South Wales
Age of Sail merchant ships
Merchant ships of the United Kingdom